Éric Rabésandratana (born 18 September 1972) is a professional football manager and former player who is the caretaker manager of the Madagascar national team. He played mainly as a defensive midfielder – he could also operate as a central defender. Born in France, he represented Madagascar internationally.

In a 17-year professional career he appeared in 191 Ligue 1 games over the course of seven seasons (15 goals), in representation of Nancy and Paris Saint-Germain.

Club career
Born in Épinay-sur-Seine, Paris, Rabésandratana was brought up at AS Nancy's youth ranks, being promoted to the first team at age 18 by coach Aimé Jacquet, who would later manage the French national team. He made his Ligue 1 debut on 8 September 1990 in a 4–1 away loss against Stade Malherbe Caen, and remained an undisputed starter throughout the duration of his spell – in the 1995–96 season, the defensive-minded player scored a career-best 16 league goals as Les Chardons promoted from Ligue 2, only to be relegated the following year.

In 1997 Rabésandratana moved to Paris Saint-Germain F.C., helping the club to the Cup, League Cup and Supercup in his debut year, and eventually gaining the club captaincy. However, with the arrival of new coach Luis Fernández, he gradually lost his importance.

After a turbulent season with Greece's AEK Athens, Rabésandratana returned home and signed with lowly LB Châteauroux. Two years after he moved to Belgium with R.A.E.C. Mons, which he helped promote in his second year, going on to be mainly used as a substitute during his spell.

International career
In 2007, Rabésandratana played for the Madagascar national team in a friendly with Toulouse FC, but this was never sanctioned by FIFA.

Coaching career
Rabésandratana retired professionally in 2007 at the age of 35, and focused on obtaining his coaching degree.

In 2014, Rabésandratana co-founded the United States Champions Soccer Academy with fellow former footballer Wagneau Eloi and entrepreneur Ravy Truchot. Additionally, he served as programming director and Eloi's assistant coach of the FC Miami City Champions, a new Premier Development League expansion franchise.

In April 2021, the Malagasy Football Federation announced Rabésandratana would serve as caretaker manager for Madagascar, following Nicolas Dupuis' suspension.

Notes

References

External links

Stats at ASNL Story 

1972 births
Living people
Sportspeople from Épinay-sur-Seine
People with acquired Malagasy citizenship
Malagasy footballers
Malagasy football managers
Madagascar international footballers
French footballers
French football managers
France youth international footballers
French sportspeople of Malagasy descent
Madagascar national football team managers
Association football defenders
Association football midfielders
Association football utility players
Ligue 1 players
Ligue 2 players
AS Nancy Lorraine players
Paris Saint-Germain F.C. players
LB Châteauroux players
AEK Athens F.C. players
Belgian Pro League players
R.A.E.C. Mons players
France under-21 international footballers
Malagasy expatriate footballers
French expatriate footballers
Expatriate footballers in Belgium
Expatriate footballers in Greece
Malagasy expatriates in Belgium
French expatriate sportspeople in Belgium
Competitors at the 1993 Mediterranean Games
Mediterranean Games bronze medalists for France
Mediterranean Games medalists in football
Association football coaches
Footballers from Seine-Saint-Denis